Rigoberto Fontao Meza (December 29, 1900 – December 29, 1936) was a Paraguayan poet. He is considered by some to be one of the greatest poets of the Paraguayan native canon. He wrote highly descriptive poems in Spanish, Guarani and Jopara.

He died in Asunción, Paraguay, on his birthday, December 29, 1936, at the age of 36.

Biography

The son of Benjamín Fontao and Marciana Meza, he was born in Tape Ka'aty, located in the San Pedro Department, Paraguay, on December 29, 1900.
 
He was friends with many of the composers of his time, including José Asunción Flores. Flores composed the lyrics of the songs "Arribeño Resay", "Ka'aty" and the first version of "India" for him.

He wrote the lyrics of "El Arriero", with Félix Pérez Cardozo composing a song for it later. The piece has since been interpreted by numerous people.
 
When Manuel Ortiz Guerrero heard Flores' interpretation for the guarania (a traditional Guarani folk song)  "India" for the first time, he showed admiration for the piece, but questioned the lyrics, saying that they did not have the same transcendence as the song, and offered to compose better lyrics. Flores and Rigoberto Fontao Meza agreed that Meza wouldn't allow the change, but Flores replaced the lyrics with ones from Guerrero, and it became the version of India known nowadays. "India"  was declared in 1944 as "Official Paraguayan Music" along with "Campamento Cerro León" and "Cerro Corá" by law of the Executive State.

List of Works

Meza wrote numerous poems throughout his lifetime. Some of his contributions to the Paraguayan folkloric canon include:

 Mba'épa Nerohasê.
 Mutilados de guerra.
 El Arriero.
 Arribeño Resay.
 Ka'a Poty.
 Che resay.
 Nde Clavelkuemi.
 Poniente Ruguaicha.
 Congoja.
 Nda vy'airamoguare.
 Guerra tiempope guare'e.

He also produced theatrical plays and published a poem book.

References

 Sonidos de mi Tierra.

1900 births
20th-century Paraguayan poets
Paraguayan male poets
1936 deaths
Guarani-language writers
20th-century male writers